Caudalejeunea is a genus of liverwort in family Lejeuneaceae. It contains the following species (but this list may be incomplete):
 Caudalejeunea grolleana Gradst.

References 

Porellales genera
Lejeuneaceae
Taxonomy articles created by Polbot